Pasqual Handi Kamindu Dilanka Mendis (born 30 September 1998), popularly as Kamindu Mendis, is a professional Sri Lankan cricketer who plays for the national team, and for Colombo Cricket Club in domestic cricket. He is an ambidextrous bowler and has bowled both right and left-arm deliveries during the same over. He made his international debut for the Sri Lanka cricket team in October 2018.

Early and domestic career
Mendis started bowling with both arms at the age of 13, while playing cricket for Richmond College, Galle. He made his List A debut alongside Charith Asalanka on 30 November 2015 in the AIA Premier Limited Over Tournament.

The following month, he was named in Sri Lanka's squad for the 2016 Under-19 Cricket World Cup. He was named as the Under-19 captain in December 2016 and captained the Sri Lankan squad for the 2018 Under-19 Cricket World Cup.

He was named in Colombo's squad for the 2017–18 Super Four Provincial Tournament and the 2018 Super Provincial One Day Tournament, before being named in the squad the 2018 SLC T20 League. He made his Twenty20 debut for Colombo on 21 August 2018.

He made his first-class debut for Tamil Union Cricket and Athletic Club in the 2018–19 Premier League Tournament on 30 November 2018. In March 2019, he was named in Colombo's squad for the 2019 Super Provincial One Day Tournament. In December 2019, he was the leading wicket-taker in the 2019–20 Invitation Limited Over Tournament, with nineteen dismissals in eight matches.

In October 2020, he was drafted by the Kandy Tuskers for the inaugural edition of the Lanka Premier League. In August 2021, he was named as the vice-captain of the SLC Greens team for the 2021 SLC Invitational T20 League tournament. In November 2021, he was selected to play for the Kandy Warriors following the players' draft for the 2021 Lanka Premier League. In July 2022, he was signed by the Kandy Falcons for the third edition of the Lanka Premier League.

International career
In August 2018, Sri Lanka Cricket named him in a preliminary squad of 31 players for the 2018 Asia Cup.

In October 2018, he was named in Sri Lanka's Twenty20 International (T20I) squad for the one-off match against England. He made his T20I debut for Sri Lanka against England on 27 October 2018. He scored 24 runs in the match.

In December 2018, he was named in Sri Lanka team for the 2018 ACC Emerging Teams Asia Cup. In February 2019, he was named in Sri Lanka's One Day International (ODI) squad for their series against South Africa. He made his ODI debut for Sri Lanka against South Africa on 10 March 2019. In November 2019, he was named as the vice-captain of Sri Lanka's squad for the 2019 ACC Emerging Teams Asia Cup in Bangladesh. Later the same month, he was named as the vice-captain of Sri Lanka's squad for the men's cricket tournament at the 2019 South Asian Games. The Sri Lanka team won the silver medal, after they lost to Bangladesh by seven wickets in the final.

In September 2021, Mendis was named in Sri Lanka's squad for the 2021 ICC Men's T20 World Cup. 

In January 2022,he was named odi squad for Zimbabwe series. 2nd odi he scored his maiden half century in OneDay International cricket against Zimbabwe.

In May 2022, he was named in Sri Lanka's Test squad for their series against Bangladesh. The following month, he was named in the Sri Lanka A squad for their matches against Australia A during Australia's tour of Sri Lanka. Later the same month, he was named in Sri Lanka's Test squad, also for their home series against Australia. He made his Test debut on 8 July 2022, for Sri Lanka against Australia. In the match, he scored his maiden Test fifty and made a match-winning partnership of 133-runs with centurion Dinesh Chandimal. Sri Lanka won the match by an innings and 39 runs, their first innings victory in Test cricket against Australia.

References

External links
 

1998 births
Living people
Sri Lankan cricketers
Sri Lanka Test cricketers
Sri Lanka One Day International cricketers
Sri Lanka Twenty20 International cricketers
Colombo Cricket Club cricketers
Galle Cricket Club cricketers
Tamil Union Cricket and Athletic Club cricketers
Sportspeople from Galle
South Asian Games silver medalists for Sri Lanka
South Asian Games medalists in cricket
Kandy Falcons cricketers